The ICC Americas Championship is the continental cricket championship for the Americas region, for Affiliate and Associate members of the International Cricket Council in North, Central and South America, and the Caribbean. Since 2006, the tournament is organized in three divisions.

The division three was played in Buenos Aires, Argentina. This tournament was won by Turks and Caicos and won one spot in the division two (played in Paramaribo, Suriname. The division two was won by the host. Suriname won one spot in the division one. The division one was played in Fort Lauderdale, United States, and was won by the host.

Division One

Division One was held in Fort Lauderdale, Florida, commencing on November 25. Six teams took part: United States (hosts), Bermuda (holders), Canada, Argentina, Cayman Islands, and Suriname (making their first appearance at this level after winning Division Two. The three venues was Brian Piccolo Park in Cooper City, Lauderhill Cricket Stadium Turf Ground and Lauderhill Cricket Stadium Artificial Ground both in Fort Lauderdale

United States won the tournament won all its games. Sushil Nadkarni (USA) was named the player of the series. Nadkarni was the leader in runs with 407 and Imran Awan (USA) and Diego Lord (Argentina) taken 9 wickets. Suriname finished bottom of the table, and were relegated back to Division Two.

Points table

Division two
The 2008 Division Three tournament, held in Suriname, saw a very close contest, with three teams each finishing with two wins. The host nation defied the odds going into the last game, skittling the Bahamas for just 57 runs, allowing them to jump to the top of the table and qualify for Division One. Troy Dudnauth (Suriname) was named the player of the tournament.

Results

Points Table

Division three
The 2008 Division Three tournament was held in Argentina and again saw an official international debut, this time that of Peru. The tournament was won by the Turks and Caicos Islands who thereby gained a place in the 2008 edition of Division Two in Suriname. Simon Shalders (Chile) was named the player of the tournament

Results

Points Table

References

External links
 Cricinfo
 ICC Cricket News

International cricket competitions in 2008
ICC Americas Championship
2008 in North American sport